This is a list of Russian federal highways and the motorway portions of them. Note that Russian federal highways in their entirety have often been mistakenly called "motorways" in English, even though they are traditionally two-lane physically undivided roads (i.e. not controlled access highways), due to their traditional name "Avtomagistral" (Автомагистраль) which can be translated to "motorway".

Motorways under construction or planned

See also
 Russian federal highways
 Transport in Russia

References